Tumi Jodi Kuwa is an Assamese musical, romantic drama film directed, dialogue and scriptwritten by Simple Gogoi and produced by Teron Jitumoni under the banner of L.N. Films. Cast list of the film are Prasenjit Borah, Jupitora Bhuyan, Munmi Kalita, Mahika Sharma, Rupam Sharma, Prince, Bhaskar Ranjan, Ranjan Dutta, Krishna. The makeup is done by Akash Gogoi, Subhash and Vijayeta. The film's story is given by Gautam Rabha. The film was released on 14 June 2013.

Plot
The movie is centered around the young generation. The story is about a group of friends who have a music band and how they try to make it big in the field, in turn facing the hurdles and overcoming them.

Soundtrack
The music of the film is scored by Chandan Bezbarua. The songs were sung by Zubeen Garg, Ananya, Dikshu, Stutima Basistha.

Accolades

References 

2013 films
Films set in Assam
2013 directorial debut films
2010s Assamese-language films